Slingshot is an upcoming American science fiction psychological thriller film directed by Mikael Håfström and written by R. Scott Adams and Nathan Parker. It stars Casey Affleck, Laurence Fishburne, Emily Beecham, Tomer Kapon, and David Morrissey.

Premise 
An astronaut on a possibly fatally endangered mission to Saturn's moon Titan struggles to keep his grip on reality.

Cast 
 Casey Affleck
 Laurence Fishburne
 Emily Beecham
 Tomer Kapon
 David Morrissey

Production 
On November 23, 2021, it was announced that Mikael Håfström would direct from a screenplay by R. Scott Adams and Nathan Parker. The film was produced by Bluestone Entertainment. Barry Chusid was the production designer and Pär M Ekberg was the cinematographer. Alongside the film announcement, Casey Affleck, Laurence Fishburne, Emily Beecham, Tomer Kapon, and David Morrissey were cast. Chelsea Ellis Bloch and Marisol Roncali were the casting directors. Filming began on December 1, 2021, at Korda Studios and other locations in Budapest, Hungary. Lorne Balfe composed the score after previously collaborating with Håfström on Outside the Wire.

References

External links 

Upcoming films
American science fiction thriller films
American psychological thriller films
Films about astronauts
Films directed by Mikael Håfström
Films scored by Lorne Balfe
Films shot in Budapest
Upcoming English-language films